The Grand Hotel Moderne is a 106 room four star hotel located in Lourdes, France.

History 

The hotel was built in 1896 by Jean Soubirous (the cousin of Saint Bernadette Soubirous) and his wife Benoite Toulet. The architect chosen to oversee the construction was Jean-Marie Lacrampe, who is also the same architect behind other structures in Lourdes including the town hall, the ramps to the Basilica of the Immaculate Conception and Castle Soum. At the time of its opening, the hotel was the first in the region to be equipped with an elevator and private bathrooms, hence its name "Le Moderne".

In 2007 the hotel was purchased by its current owners, the Tedesco family, an Italian tour operator who announced the immediate renovation that would bring "a second youth to the hotel". The reported 1.5 to 2.7 million of renovation works included the hydro-gommage of its baroque facade, modernizing all its guest rooms, and restoring the original woodwork of the art-nouveau designer Louis Majorelle in the hotel’s dining room and staircase.

References

External links
 Grand Hotel Moderne Homepage

Lourdes
Art Nouveau architecture in France
Hotels in France
Art Nouveau hotels
Hotel buildings completed in 1896